Florence Hedges (August 24, 1878 – December 17, 1956) was a pioneering American plant pathologist and botanist with the United States Department of Agriculture's Bureau of Plant Industry.

Life and career
Hedges was born in Lansing, Michigan. She graduated from University of Michigan in 1901. Much of her work involved investigations into bacteria-induced plant disease. Charlotte Elliot, Hellie A. Brown, Edith Cash, Mary Katharine Bryan, Anna Jenkins, and Lucia McCulloch, Pearle Smith, and Angie Beckwith were among the people she worked with while a researcher at the USDA.

With Erwin Frink Smith, she also translated the 1896 biography of Louis Pasteur by Émile Duclaux.

She died in San Francisco, California.

References

External links

Florence Hedges (1878-1956) via Smithsonian Institution

1878 births
1956 deaths
20th-century American botanists
Women botanists
Writers from Lansing, Michigan
University of Michigan alumni
20th-century American translators
20th-century American women scientists
United States Department of Agriculture people